Gabriel Gonzaga Santos Nogueira (born 18 May 1979) is a Brazilian former professional mixed martial artist, submission grappler and 5th degree Brazilian jiu-jitsu (BJJ) black belt.

Gonzaga is a World IBJJF Jiu-Jitsu champion in the Ultra Heavyweight black belt division and a ADCC Submission Fighting World medallist, two of the most prestigious tournaments in the sport.

In 2003 Gonzaga started MMA. In 2006 he started competing in the Heavyweight division of the Ultimate Fighting Championship. He is perhaps best known for his upset head-kick knockout of Mirko Cro Cop at UFC 70, which earned him a heavyweight title shot.

Background
Gonzaga was born in Rio de Janeiro, Brazil and began training in judo when he was 14 years old. before later transitioning to Brazilian jiu-jitsu, under the tutelage of Wander Braga. Gonzaga would go on to achieve many accomplishments in the sport before transitioning into a career in MMA.

Mixed martial arts career

Early career
Gonzaga made his professional MMA debut on 4 April 2003 in Santos, Brazil against Cicero Costa, winning via submission due to punches in the first round. He went on to compile a 4-1 professional record with his only loss coming via TKO to Fabrício Werdum.

Ultimate Fighting Championship
He made his UFC debut at UFC 56, knocking out Kevin Jordan with a superman punch at 4:39 of the third round. However, weeks before the fight, his pregnant wife started having complications with her pregnancy and lost one of the twins she was carrying. Gonzaga's obligations to his wife during her high risk pregnancy left him unable to train properly.

Gonzaga would later return at UFC 60 with a win over Fabiano Scherner via TKO in the second round. At UFC 66 he would defeat Carmelo Marrero in the first round by armbar.

At UFC 70, Gonzaga knocked out Mirko Cro Cop with a head kick, Cro Cop's own signature move. With the win, Gonzaga was granted a title shot against UFC Heavyweight Champion Randy Couture. The knockout was the consensus Knockout of the Year for 2007.

Gonzaga faced Randy Couture for the UFC Heavyweight Championship at UFC 74. He lost the fight via TKO due to punches from the mount at the 1:37 mark of the third round.

Gonzaga returned to the Octagon to face the only man that had beaten him prior to the Couture fight, Fabrício Werdum, at UFC 80, losing once again via TKO in the second round.

Gonzaga faced Justin McCully at UFC 86. Early in the first round, McCully fell to the ground due to a powerful leg kick from Gonzaga. Gonzaga took to McCully's half guard, quickly passing to the mount position and winning by first round submission with an americana from the mount.

At UFC 91 Gonzaga knocked out UFC newcomer Josh Hendricks with a right hand at 1:01 of the first round.

Gonzaga then faced undefeated heavyweight prospect Shane Carwin at UFC 96. In the first 30 seconds of the fight, Gonzaga caught Carwin with an uppercut and two left hooks, breaking his nose. Gonzaga took the fight to the floor, but Carwin quickly fought back to his feet. Against the fence, Carwin pushed Gonzaga away and threw an overhand right that knocked Gonzaga out. The referee called the match at 69 seconds of round one, handing Gonzaga his fourth career loss.

At UFC 102 Gonzaga defeated Chris Tuchscherer via TKO at 2:27 of the first round. The fight, however, was controversial, as Gonzaga landed an illegal low blow that hurt Tuchsherer very badly. While Tuchsherer was able to continue after taking a full five-minute rest, Gonzaga landed a powerful head kick and continued to dominate the rest of the fight, eventually finishing the fight via strikes.

Gonzaga was set to fight Junior dos Santos at UFC 108; however, it was reported that he had pulled out of the fight due to a staph infection.

The fight between Gonzaga and dos Santos eventually took place on 21 March 2010 at UFC LIVE: Vera vs. Jones, with Gonzaga losing via knockout in the first round.

Gonzaga was defeated by Brendan Schaub on 23 October 2010 at UFC 121 by unanimous decision. All three judges scored the fight 30–27 after Gonzaga was out-struck throughout all three rounds by Schaub.  This was also the first bout in Gonzaga's professional career to go the distance.

Following the loss to Schaub, Gonzaga was released from the promotion.

Post UFC
After being released by the UFC, Gonzaga stated that he would only compete in Brazilian jiu-jitsu but expressed interest in returning to MMA. Gonzaga returned to action against Reality Fighting Heavyweight Champion Parker Porter. Gonzaga fought Porter on 8 October where he submitted him with an arm-triangle choke in the third round, winning the Reality Fighting Heavyweight Championship.

Return to the UFC
It was announced that Gonzaga signed a new, four-fight contract with the Ultimate Fighting Championship on 16 December 2011. In his return bout, he faced Ednaldo Oliveira at UFC 142, replacing an injured Rob Broughton. Gonzaga won the fight via submission in the first round.

Gabriel Gonzaga was expected to face Shane del Rosario at UFC 146 on 26 May 2012. Gabriel was pulled from the bout against Shane Del Rosario to replace Antônio Silva against Roy Nelson, after Silva was switched to meet Cain Velasquez. Gonzaga later was forced out of the bout against Roy Nelson because of an injury, being replaced by Dave Herman.

Gonzaga was expected to face promotional newcomer and fellow Brazilian Geronimo dos Santos on 13 October 2012 at UFC 153 but dos Santos dropped off the card for an undisclosed reason. As no replacement was scheduled, Gonzaga was also removed from the card.

Gonzaga faced Ben Rothwell on 19 January 2013 at UFC on FX: Belfort vs. Bisping He won the fight via submission in the second round.

Gonzaga lost via first-round knockout to Travis Browne on 13 April 2013 at The Ultimate Fighter 17 Finale.

Gonzaga faced Dave Herman on 6 July 2013 at UFC 162, replacing Shane del Rosario who had to withdraw from the bout due to an injury. Gonzaga won via KO 17 seconds into the first round.

Gonzaga next faced Shawn Jordan on 19 October 2013 at UFC 166. He won the fight via knockout at 1:13 of round one. This was Gonzaga's second consecutive first-round knockout.

Gonzaga faced Stipe Miocic on 25 January 2014 at UFC on Fox 10. He lost the fight via unanimous decision. Post-fight, Gonzaga stated online that he broke his hand in the first round.

Gonzaga faced Matt Mitrione on 13 December 2014 at UFC on Fox 13. He lost the bout in the first round via TKO.

Gonzaga faced returning veteran Mirko Cro Cop in a rematch on 11 April 2015 at UFC Fight Night 64. After dominantly winning the first two rounds and being up 20–17 on the scorecards, Gonzaga was finished by TKO in the third round after a surprise flurry of elbows and punches managed to hurt him and turn the fight around in an instant. Gonzaga later stated that he wasn't ready for all 5 rounds, and that he was surprised by Cro Cop's strength and improved elbows. The bout earned both men Fight of the Night bonus honors.

Gonzaga faced Konstantin Erokhin on 11 December 2015 at The Ultimate Fighter 22 Finale. He won the fight by unanimous decision (30–27, 30–27, and 30–28).

Gonzaga was expected to face Ruslan Magomedov on 10 April 2016 at UFC Fight Night 86. However, Magomedov was forced out of the bout in early March due to injury and replaced by Derrick Lewis.  Gonzaga lost the fight via KO in the first round.

On 30 September 2016 it was announced that Gonzaga would be retiring from the sport unless offered a 6-figure contract from the UFC.

Professional boxing career
On 14 September 2017, it was announced that Gonzaga would be making his pro boxing debut for the Rivera Promotions Entertainment (RPE) boxing promotion on 26 October against Alejandro Esquilin Santiago. Gonzaga won the four-round bout via majority decision.

Bare-knuckle boxing
On August 28, 2019, it was announced that Gonzaga would make his promotional debut headlining BKFC 8 against fellow UFC veteran Antônio Silva on October 19, 2019. He won the fight via knockout in the second round.

Personal life
Gonzaga has a daughter and a son. They live in Massachusetts.

Championships and accomplishments

Mixed martial arts
Ultimate Fighting Championship
Knockout of the Night (One time)
Fight of the Night (Two times)
 Second for most finishes in the UFC heavyweight division (11)
 Tied for the third most finishes in UFC history (11)
2007 Knockout of the Year  vs. Mirko Cro Cop on 21 April 
FIGHT! Magazine
2007 Knockout of the Year  vs. Mirko Cro Cop on 21 April
Fight Matrix
Most Lopsided Upset of the Year (2007)
Inside Fights
2007 Knockout of the Year  vs. Mirko Cro Cop on 21 April 
Reality Fighting
Reality Fighting Heavyweight Championship (One time)

Brazilian jiu-jitsu
Confederação Brasileira de Jiu Jitsu Olímpico
 2006 CBJJO World Cup Super Heavyweight Champion (Black Belt)
 2005 CBJJO World Cup Super Heavyweight Runner-Up (Black Belt) 
 2005 CBJJO World Cup Absolute 3rd Place (Black Belt) 
 2003 CBJJO World Cup Super Heavyweight Runner-Up (Black Belt) 
 2003 CBJJO World Cup Absolute Runner-Up (Black Belt)  

Confederação Brasileira de Jiu Jitsu
 2006 CBJJ Mundials Super Heavyweight Champion (Black Belt)   
 2005 CBJJ Brazilian Nationals 3rd Place (Black Belt) 
 1999 CBJJ Brazilian Nationals 3rd Place 
 1996/1997 CBJJ Brazilian Nationals Champion (Purple Belt) 

International Brazilian Jiu-Jitsu Federation 
 2019 World Masters IBJJF Jiu-Jitsu Championship Super Heavyweight Champion (Black Belt) 
 2000 World Brazilian Jiu-Jitsu Championship Super Heavyweight 3rd Place (Black Belt)
 1999 World Brazilian Jiu-Jitsu Championship Super Heavyweight 3rd Place (Brown Belt)

Submission grappling
ADCC Submission Wrestling World Championship 
2005 ADCC +99 kg Runner-Up 
Opponents:
Won: Mustapha al-Turk (pts), Ricco Rodriguez (pts), Marcio Cruz (pts), Eduardo Telles (pts)
Lost: Jeff Monson (pts), Xande Ribeiro (sub)

Mixed martial arts record 

|-
|Loss
|align=center|17–12
|Alexander Emelianenko
|TKO (punches and knees)
|RCC: Russian Cagefighting Championship 2
|
|align=center|2
|align=center|3:43
|Yekaterinburg, Russia
| 
|-
|Loss
|align=center|17–11
|Derrick Lewis
|KO (punches)
|UFC Fight Night: Rothwell vs. dos Santos
|
|align=center|1
|align=center|4:48
|Zagreb, Croatia
| 
|-
|Win
|align=center|17–10
|Konstantin Erokhin
|Decision (unanimous)
|The Ultimate Fighter: Team McGregor vs. Team Faber Finale
|
|align=center|3
|align=center|5:00
|Las Vegas, Nevada, United States
|   
|-
|Loss
|align=center|16–10
|Mirko Cro Cop
|TKO (elbows and punches)
|UFC Fight Night: Gonzaga vs. Cro Cop 2
|
|align=center|3
|align=center|3:30 	
|Kraków, Poland
|
|-
|Loss
|align=center|16–9
|Matt Mitrione
|TKO (punches)
|UFC on Fox: dos Santos vs. Miocic
|
|align=center|1
|align=center|1:59
|Phoenix, Arizona, United States
|
|-
|Loss
|align=center|16–8
|Stipe Miocic
|Decision (unanimous)
|UFC on Fox: Henderson vs. Thomson
|
|align=center|3
|align=center|5:00
|Chicago, Illinois, United States
|
|-
| Win
| align=center| 16–7
| Shawn Jordan
| KO (punches)
| UFC 166
| 
| align=center| 1
| align=center| 1:33
| Houston, Texas, United States
| 
|-
| Win
| align=center| 15–7
| Dave Herman
| KO (punches)
| UFC 162
| 
| align=center| 1
| align=center| 0:17
| Las Vegas, Nevada, United States
| 
|-
| Loss
| align=center| 14–7
| Travis Browne
| KO (elbows)
| The Ultimate Fighter: Team Jones vs. Team Sonnen Finale
| 
| align=center| 1
| align=center| 1:11
| Las Vegas, Nevada, United States
| 
|-
| Win
| align=center| 14–6
| Ben Rothwell
| Submission (guillotine choke)
| UFC on FX: Belfort vs. Bisping
| 
| align=center| 2
| align=center| 1:01
| São Paulo, Brazil
| 
|-
| Win
| align=center| 13–6
| Ednaldo Oliveira
| Submission (rear-naked choke)
| UFC 142
| 
| align=center| 1
| align=center| 3:22
| Rio de Janeiro, Brazil
| 
|-
| Win
| align=center| 12–6
| Parker Porter
| Submission (arm-triangle choke)
| Reality Fighting: Gonzaga vs. Porter
| 
| align=center| 3
| align=center| 1:50
| Uncasville, Connecticut, United States
| 
|-
| Loss
| align=center| 11–6
| Brendan Schaub
| Decision (unanimous)
| UFC 121
| 
| align=center| 3
| align=center| 5:00
| Anaheim, California, United States
| 
|-
| Loss
| align=center| 11–5
| Junior dos Santos
| TKO (punches)
| UFC Live: Vera vs. Jones
| 
| align=center| 1
| align=center| 3:53
| Broomfield, Colorado, United States
| 
|-
| Win
| align=center| 11–4
| Chris Tuchscherer
| TKO (punches)
| UFC 102
| 
| align=center| 1
| align=center| 2:27
| Portland, Oregon, United States
| 
|-
| Loss
| align=center| 10–4
| Shane Carwin
| KO (punch)
| UFC 96
| 
| align=center| 1
| align=center| 1:09
| Columbus, Ohio, United States
| 
|-
| Win
| align=center| 10–3
| Josh Hendricks
| KO (punches)
| UFC 91
| 
| align=center| 1
| align=center| 1:01
| Las Vegas, Nevada, United States
| 
|-
| Win
| align=center| 9–3
| Justin McCully
| Submission (americana)
| UFC 86
| 
| align=center| 1
| align=center| 1:57
| Las Vegas, Nevada, United States
| 
|-
| Loss
| align=center| 8–3
| Fabrício Werdum
| TKO (punches)
| UFC 80
| 
| align=center| 2
| align=center| 4:34
| Newcastle upon Tyne, England
| 
|-
| Loss
| align=center| 8–2
| Randy Couture
| TKO (punches)
| UFC 74
| 
| align=center| 3
| align=center| 1:37
| Las Vegas, Nevada, United States
| 
|-
| Win
| align=center| 8–1
| Mirko Cro Cop
| KO (head kick)
| UFC 70
| 
| align=center| 1
| align=center| 4:51
| Manchester, England
| 
|-
| Win
| align=center| 7–1
| Carmelo Marrero
| Submission (armbar)
| UFC 66
| 
| align=center| 1
| align=center| 3:22
| Las Vegas, Nevada, United States
| 
|-
| Win
| align=center| 6–1
| Fabiano Scherner
| TKO (punches)
| UFC 60
| 
| align=center| 2
| align=center| 0:24
| Los Angeles, California, United States
| 
|-
| Win
| align=center| 5–1
| Kevin Jordan
| KO (superman punch)
| UFC 56
| 
| align=center| 3
| align=center| 4:39
| Las Vegas, Nevada, United States
| 
|-
| Win
| align=center| 4–1
| Walter Farias
| Submission (neck crank)
| Shooto Brazil: Never Shake
| 
| align=center| 2
| align=center| N/A
| São Paulo, Brazil
| 
|-
| Win
| align=center| 3–1
| Charlie Brown
| TKO (retirement)
| Jungle Fight 2
| 
| align=center| 3
| align=center| N/A
| Manaus, Brazil
| 
|-
| Loss
| align=center| 2–1
| Fabrício Werdum
| TKO (punches)
| Jungle Fight 1
| 
| align=center| 3
| align=center| 2:11
| Manaus, Brazil
| 
|-
| Win
| align=center| 2–0
| Branden Lee Hinkle
| Submission (triangle choke)
| Meca 9: Meca World Vale Tudo 9
| 
| align=center| 1
| align=center| 3:54
| Rio de Janeiro, Brazil
| 
|-
| Win
| align=center| 1–0
| Cicero Costa
| TKO (submission to punches)
| Brazilian Gladiators 2
| 
| align=center| 1
| align=center| N/A
| São Paulo, Brazil
|

Professional boxing record

Bare knuckle record

|-
|Win
|align=center|1–0
|Antônio Silva
|KO (punches)
|Bare Knuckle FC 8
|
|align=center|2
|align=center|1:50
|Tampa, Florida, United States
|
|-

See also
 List of current UFC fighters
 List of male mixed martial artists
 List of Brazilian Jiu-Jitsu practitioners

Notes

References

External links
Official site Gabriel "Napão" Gonzaga 

Squared BJJ
UFC Profile

Living people
1979 births
Brazilian male mixed martial artists
Heavyweight mixed martial artists
Mixed martial artists utilizing boxing
Mixed martial artists utilizing Brazilian jiu-jitsu
Bare-knuckle boxers 
Brazilian practitioners of Brazilian jiu-jitsu
People awarded a black belt in Brazilian jiu-jitsu
Brazilian submission wrestlers
Sportspeople from Rio de Janeiro (city)
Brazilian expatriate sportspeople in the United States
People from Ludlow, Massachusetts
Ultimate Fighting Championship male fighters
Brazilian jiu-jitsu practitioners who have competed in MMA (men)